Natica collaria, common name the collared moon snail, is a species of predatory sea snail, a marine gastropod mollusk in the family Naticidae, the moon snails.

Description
The size of the shell varies between 25 mm and 32 mm.

Distribution
This snail occurs in the Atlantic Ocean off Senegal, Mauritania, Gabon and Angola.

References

 Gofas, S.; Afonso, J.P.; Brandào, M. (Ed.). (S.a.). Conchas e Moluscos de Angola = Coquillages et Mollusques d'Angola. [Shells and molluscs of Angola]. Universidade Agostinho / Elf Aquitaine Angola: Angola. 140 pp

External links
 

Naticidae
Gastropods described in 1822